Branko Zinaja (28 September 1895 – 20 September 1949) was a Croatian footballer.

Career
He played in six matches for the Yugoslavia national football team between 1921 and 1923.

References

External links
 

1895 births
1949 deaths
Sportspeople from Varaždin
Association football forwards
Yugoslav footballers
Yugoslavia international footballers
HAŠK players